Ženski rokometni klub Ajdovščina is a women's handball club from Ajdovščina, Slovenia. The club competes in the Slovenian First League under the name Mlinotest Ajdovščina due to sponsorship reasons.

European record 
All results (home and away) list Mlinotest's goal tally first.

External links

 
 EHF Club profile

Handball clubs established in 1958
Slovenian handball clubs
1958 establishments in Slovenia
Ajdovščina